Yes! PreCure 5 GoGo! is the fifth Pretty Cure anime television series produced by Toei Animation. It continues on from the previous series, the girls have been granted new powers in order to save the Four Kings of the various kingdoms surrounding the Palmier Kingdom and to protect Flora and the Cure Rose Garden from the evil organization Eternal. The series began airing in Japan from February 3, 2008 to January 25, 2009, replacing Yes! PreCure 5 in its initial timeslot and was succeeded by Fresh Pretty Cure!. The series uses three pieces of theme music, one opening and two ending themes. The opening theme is "PreCure 5, Full Throttle Go Go!" (プリキュア5、フル·スロットルGO GO! Purikyua Faibu, Furu Surottoru Gō Gō!), performed by Kudou. From episode 1-29, the first ending theme is "Te to Te Tsunaide Heart mo Link!!" (手と手つないでハートもリンク!! Te to Te Tsunaide Hāto mo Rinku!!, "From Hand to Hand, the Heart also Links!!") performed by Miyamoto with Young Fresh. The second ending "Ganbalance de Dance ~Kibō no Relay~" (ガンバランス de ダンス～希望のリレー～ Ganbalance de Dance ~Kibō no Rirē~, "Ganbalance de Dance ~Relay of Hope~) was used for episodes 30-48 of the series, and performed by the Cure Quartet, comprising Gojo, Uchiyae, Kudou, and Miyamoto. Two insert songs were also used in the series, the first being "Twin Tail no Mahō" (ツイン・テールの魔法 Tsuin Tēru no Mahō?, "Magic of the Pigtails") by Ise as Urara Kasugano in episode 18, and the other "Ashita, Hana Saku. Egao, Saku." (明日、花咲く。笑顔、咲く。"Tomorrow the Flower Blooms. The Smile Blooms.") by the Cure Quartet, sung right before the ending theme played on episode 48.


Episode list

See also
Yes! Precure 5 GoGo! the Movie: Happy Birthday in the Sweets Kingdom - An animated film based on the series.

References 

2008 Japanese television seasons
2009 Japanese television seasons
Yes! Precure 5 GoGo!

es:Anexo:Episodios de Futari wa Pretty Cure